The 2011 World Polo Championship was played in Estancia Grande (San Luis) Argentina during October 2011 and was won by Argentina. This event brought together ten teams from around the world.

Final Match

Final rankings

External links
 FIP World Championship IX

2011
Sport in San Luis Province
P
2011 in polo
Polo competitions in Argentina